City Heat is a 1984 American buddy-crime-comedy film starring Clint Eastwood and Burt Reynolds, written by Blake Edwards, and directed by Richard Benjamin. The film was released in North America in December 1984.

The pairing of Eastwood and Reynolds was expected to be a major box-office hit, but the film earned a disappointing $38.3 million against a $25 million budget.

Plot
In Kansas City, 1933, police lieutenant Speer goes to a diner for coffee. Two men arrive, looking for a former cop turned private eye named Mike Murphy. Speer and Murphy were good friends until the latter left the force. The men pounce on Murphy the minute he arrives. Speer ignores them until a goon causes him to spill his coffee. Both goons are thrown through the front door. Murphy sarcastically thanks Speer for saving his life.

The two rivals have eyes for Murphy's secretary Addy. She loves both and proves it when, after tenderly kissing Murphy goodbye, she goes on a date with Speer. Murphy has a new romantic interest, a rich socialite named Caroline Howley, but finds himself unable to commit.

Speer and Addy go to a boxing match where the mob boss Leon Coll is present. Murphy's partner Diehl Swift is also there, and he seems to be in cahoots with Primo Pitt and his gang. Swift is in possession of a suitcase whose contents are supposed to be the accounting records of Coll's operations. The ledgers are the target of both Pitt's gang and Coll's gang. Coll's financial records are actually in the possession of his bookkeeper, who met and colluded with Swift earlier at the club where black singer Ginny Lee is the star attraction.

Swift leaves the boxing ring, tailed by Speer and Addy, and he is confronted by Pitt and his thugs at his apartment with Ginny, who is taken hostage. She manages to escape but Swift is killed during a struggle with Pitt. A thug opens the suitcase, but it is empty. He picks up Swift's body and throws it out the window, where it lands on the roof of Speer's parked car (occupied by the horrified Addy, who waits while Speer goes to investigate in the apartment).

Murphy vows revenge on Pitt for killing his partner. He asks Speer for assistance, and they form an alliance. After meeting with Murphy at a movie, Ginny is confronted by Pitt's thugs outside the theater. As she tries to escape, she is hit by a car and seriously injured.

After Murphy shows Addy the "laundry" containing the missing financial records, two goons shoot holes through his apartment door. He hits them with a baseball bat when they charge into the apartment and then runs. A gun fight between Coll's men and Pitt's men breaks out on the street below. Murphy hides as the rival thugs battle it out, with Lieutenant Speer watching until one puts a round through Speer's car windshield. Speer pulls out a 12-gauge shotgun, walks up the street, and finishes the fight. Murphy and Speer vow to avenge Ginny and to rescue Caroline, who has been kidnapped by Pitt's gang to force Murphy to hand over the missing records. A final showdown with Pitt and his gang occurs in a warehouse.

In a high class bordello, Speer and Murphy rescue Caroline. Coll shows up holding Addy at gunpoint and demands his records. Murphy hands over the books in exchange for Addy, but the suitcase is booby-trapped; Coll's car is blown up with him in it.

The movie ends with Speer, Addy, Murphy, and Caroline double-dating at the club, listening to Ginny sing and enjoying themselves until Murphy's smart mouth provokes a brawl with some of the other patrons.

Cast
 Clint Eastwood as Lieutenant Speer
 Burt Reynolds as Mike Murphy, P.I.
 Jane Alexander as Addy, Murphy's Secretary
 Madeline Kahn as Caroline Howley
 Rip Torn as Primo Pitt
 Beau Starr as Pitt Lookout
 Irene Cara as Ginny Lee
 Richard Roundtree as Diehl Swift, P.I.
 Tony Lo Bianco as Leon Coll
 William Sanderson as Lonnie Ash
 Nicholas Worth as Troy Roker
 Robert Davi as Nino
 Art LaFleur as "Bruiser"
 Jack Nance as Aram Strossell, The Bookkeeper
 Tab Thacker as Tuck, The Bouncer
 Tom Spratley as Chauffeur

Production
Blake Edwards wrote the script, initially titled Kansas City Jazz. He originally wrote the script in the 1970s while living in Switzerland. "I really wrote the story for myself," says Edwards. "But when Julie read it, she thought it was the best thing I'd done and over the years friends urged me to film it. So to see it turned into something completely different was very painful for me."

Edwards originally was attached to direct, but he was fired during pre-production and replaced with Richard Benjamin. Edwards retained co-writing credit under the pseudonym Sam O. Brown, the initials of which are S.O.B., a reference to his earlier film in which Andrews acted.

"The whole thing was such a horrendous experience, it could have come right out of S.O.B.," said Edwards. 'In fact it inspired me to write S.O.B. 2.'

Reynolds later recalled:

If you could just release the announcement for City Heat and not have to look at the film, it'd be the most successful picture I'd ever been in. Blake laid out his way for Clint to play his part. To me, it was clearly apparent that Blake's way was in no way how Clint saw the part. Clint didn't say anything except his Gary Cooper comments like "Yup" and "Nope." Clint and I went home in his truck, and he still didn't say anything until we were halfway there. Finally he said "I guess this won't be the film we do together." I said "I didn't think so." Warner Bros. really wanted to make the film. I think they thought like I did that it would be one of those pictures which would look great in the catalogue...Clint likes a director he gets along with, which makes a lot of sense to me...Blake's dismissal hurt him badly. I don't think he's ever gotten over it.

Eastwood was cast as the lead and received a salary of $4 million.

Filming began in February 1984. On the first day, Reynolds was accidentally hit in the face with a metal chair during a fight scene. His jaw was broken, and he was restricted to a liquid diet, causing him to lose over 30 pounds by the time filming wrapped. His condition made headlines in the tabloids, which speculated he had AIDS.

On Monday, September 20, 2021, an interview with the film's director Richard Benjamin was released on Gilbert Gottfried's Amazing Colossal Podcast that contradicted this story of a stunt injury. Richard Benjamin said that Reynolds’ terrible jaw injury was caused when the actor fell from a make-up chair and hit his jaw.

Soundtrack
Clint Eastwood, a jazz aficionado, is one of the pianists heard on jazz-oriented soundtrack composed by Lennie Niehaus.

Release and reception
City Heat was released in United States theaters in December 1984. It grossed $38.3 million at the North American box office.

For his roles in this film and Cannonball Run II, Reynolds was nominated for a Razzie Award for Worst Actor. Reynolds later recalled:

Ten days after shooting began, I knew I was going to take the fall. Clint was playing formula Clint that always worked for Clint. I was playing Jack Lemmon in this strange film where people were getting blown away. I never read a review of the film because I knew I was going to get killed by the critics. The public wanted Boom Town or to see us in a contemporary film. They didn't want "Dirty Harry vs. the Wimp". It's regrettable the material wasn't there because Hollywood or maybe just Warner Bros. will never let Clint and I act together again.

City Heat received lackluster reviews, and critics expressed their disappointment with the script and the pairing of the two star actors. On Rotten Tomatoes, 14 of the 18 reviewers cited gave the film a "rotten" review for a score of 22%. On Metacritic, the film has a weighted average score of 39 out of 100, based on 11 critics, indicating "generally unfavorable reviews". Roger Ebert gave the film half a star, asking "How do travesties like this get made?" Gene Siskel gave the film zero stars, writing "Save for two moments when Eastwood does an amusing parody of his angry squint, City Heat is devoid of humor, excitement and amazingly, a comprehensible story."

Janet Maslin was more positive, writing "overdressed and overplotted as it is, City Heat benefits greatly from the sardonic teamwork of Clint Eastwood and Burt Reynolds. Without them the film would be eminently forgettable, but their bantering gives it an enjoyable edge". According to Maslin:

[T]he film...manages to be both cumbersome and slight. As he did in My Favorite Year and, to some extent, in Racing with the Moon, Richard Benjamin has settled on an evocative time period and a top-notch cast and more or less left things at that. City Heat devotes much more energy to props, sets and outfits than to the dramatic streamlining it so badly needed. The screenplay - which is part The Sting, part Sam Spade and part kitchen sink - is either a hopelessly convoluted genre piece or a much too subtle take-off on the same.

Variety wrote of the star duo: 'This will hardly go down as one of the highlights in either of their careers, but there remains a certain pleasure just in seeing them square off together in a good-natured arm-wrestling match of charisma and star voltage. Nevertheless, one might have hoped for material more exciting than this hokum.' Paul Attanasio of The Washington Post criticized the "embarrassingly broad comedy and Benjamin's smarmy fealty toward his leads. Inside this star vehicle, there's a real movie screaming for air.' Kevin Thomas of the Los Angeles Times wrote that Eastwood and Reynolds were "in fine fettle on their own and together, playing off each other beautifully. But the pleasure derived in watching them poke fun at themselves and each other in this period gangster comedy is spoiled by a numbing display of violence that is far too literal for such hokum."

References

Bibliography

External links
 
 
 
 
 DVD Review Review of the film & DVD at Vista Records
 Blu-ray Review at Blu-ray.com

1984 films
1980s crime action films
1980s buddy comedy films
1980s crime comedy films
American action comedy films
American buddy comedy films
American buddy cop films
American crime comedy films
American detective films
American crime action films
1980s English-language films
Films about organized crime in the United States
Films directed by Richard Benjamin
Films set in 1933
Films set in Kansas
Warner Bros. films
Films scored by Lennie Niehaus
1980s buddy cop films
Malpaso Productions films
1984 comedy films
Jazz films
1980s American films